Van Cleve, Van Cleave or Vancleave may refer to:

Places in the United States:
Van Cleve, Marshall County, Iowa
Vancleave, Mississippi, a census-designated place
Van Cleve, Missouri, an unincorporated community
Van Cleve Opera House, Hartford City, Indiana, opened in 1882

People:
Cleve (surname), which also includes people surnamed Van Cleve or van Cleve
Van Cleave (surname), a list of people with the surname Van Cleave or Vancleave